This is a list of gliders/sailplanes of the world, (this reference lists all gliders with references, where available) 
Note: Any aircraft can glide for a short time, but gliders are designed to glide for longer.

Czechoslovakian miscellaneous constructors
Data from:
 ASP-3 – Brno Technical university – aka NSv-3
 Benes LD 605 Haban
 Bohemia B.5 – HALLER, Oldřich
 Dvořáček BDV-2 1931 DVOŘÁČEK, Břetislav
 FPZ-I Chichich
 HALLER ZA-2 1923 HALLER, Oldřich
 Hela-Zbodlina 1936 CACÁK, Antonín & ŠOLC...
 HLDZ-1 1924 Cpt. ZEMAN, Tomáš
 HLDZ-2 Čáp 1924 ZEMAN, Tomáš
 Hofírkův Milan – HOFÍREK, Stanislav
 Holeka Míra 3 1924 HOLEKA, Rudolf
 JK-1 Perun
 KKB-15 – Kusbach Bartoník & Kotolánem
 Kodytek 1925 glider KODYTEK, Josef
 Královič K-7 Úderník 1953 Kráľovič, Anton
 KRYŠPÍN JK-1 Perun 1922 KRYŠPÍN, Jan
LET L-13 Blaník – Let Kunovice – Dlouhý, Karel
 Litomyšl-1 1927 – BÍNA, Karel
 Matejcek M-17 Universal – Matejcek, Jiri – students of the Central Aeronautical Institute, Brno-Medlanky
 Mayer MO-9 1935 MAYER, Oldřich
 Mayerovi Chachar 1927 MAYEROVI, Oskar & MAYERO...
 MiMi B-3 Šídlo 1950 Milose Micika
 Mišurec-Pučan MP-2 1935 MIŠUREC, Jindrich & PU�...
 MOV Káně 1935 MAYER, Oldřich
 Můra 1922
 Nebeský NSV-3 1925 NEBESKÝ, Jaroslav & NEB... 
 Nitra 1 – Štkpt. Koželuh
 Nitra 3 1925 Štkpt. KOŽELUH
 Orlican VT-16 Orlik 1956 Orlican Chocen
 Orlican VT-116 Orlik II
 Orlican VSO 10
 Pánka 1924 1924 Pánka
 Pavelek P-1 1936 PAVELEK, František
 Pavelek P-2 1937 PAVELEK, František
 Pešta Peta-Z 1934 PEŠTA, František
 Phoenix Air Phoenix – Phoenix Air sro Letrohrad, Czech Republic
 Pitrman PP-1 Tulák 1936 PITRMAN, František & PE...
 Praha 1922 glider – Skupina Konstrktér
 Prěmysl P-3
 Racek-3 Mrkev 1935 KANTOR, František
 Rackaři ŠBK-1 Racek-1
 Revallo R-1 Urpín
 Schmid S-1 1925 SCHMID, Jaromír
 Schmid S-3 1929 SCHMID, Jaromír
 Slamka-Plesko SP-II Osa 1946 SLAMKA, Rudolf & PLESKO,...
 Špitálský ŠP-2 Kamarád 1934 ŠPITÁLSKÝ, Jaroslav
 Špitálský ŠP-2A Fortuna 1936 ŠPITÁLSKÝ, Jaroslav
 ŠPŠ-1 Bábinka 1931 ŠPITÁLSKÝ, Jaroslav
 ŠTROS K-2 Sova 1938 ŠTROS, Vladimir
 ŠTROS K-3 Sokol 1939 ŠTROS, Vladimir
 Suchý BS-1 1933 SUCHÝ, Jindřich & SUCH...
 Suchý BS-2 Olešná 1935 SUCHÝ, Jindřich & SUCH...
 Sup 1922 glider
 Trejbal-Prasil Rok Vyroby
 Tulák 37
 Tunzeng Zobor 1 1923 TUNZENG, Jaromír
 Tunzeng Zobor 2 1925 TUNZENG, Jaromír
 Váhaly-Sands Jánošík 1936 VÁHALY, H. & SANDS, S.
 Vinklar Polydor 1937 VINKLAR, Karel & ŠVEBI�...
 Voříšek Sup 1922 1922 VOŘÍŠEK, Jaroslav
 VP-1 Jánošík 1936 VÁHALA, Hubert & PLEŠK...
 VSM-40 Démant
 Orlican VSO 10 Vosa – Vyvojova Skupina Orlican
 Vyskočil VŠ-504 Hemelice VYSKOČIL, Jaroslav
 Wiesner Schrudim 1937 WIESNER, Jaroslav
 Zrna FPZ-1 Chichich 1936 ZRNA, Antonín

Notes

Further reading

External links

Lists of glider aircraft